The Burkina Faso Rugby Federation is the governing body for rugby union in Burkina Faso. It was founded in 1992 and organises and oversees local and international rugby involving Burkina Faso. The Burkina Faso Rugby Federation became affiliated to Rugby Africa in 2006. It became an associate member of World Rugby in 2018 and was voted a full member in 2020.

Notable former players 
  Steffen Williams

References

External links 
 Official Site

Rugby union governing bodies in Africa
Rugby union in Burkina Faso
Sports governing bodies in Burkina Faso
Sports organizations established in 1992
1992 establishments in Burkina Faso